Klajn may refer to:

 Ivan Klajn (1937–2021), Serbian linguist, philologist and language historian
 Mihajlo Klajn (1912–1941), Croatian agronomist and communist

See also
 Klein (disambiguation)